Drosera madagascariensis is a carnivorous plant of the sundew genus (Drosera). It was described in 1824 by A. P. de Candolle and is native to Africa.

Description 
Drosera madagascariensis is a robust stem-forming species with a clearly visible stem, which stands upright in the case of younger plants and either uses its leaves to anchor itself to surrounding vegetation as it matures or bends over and forms a scrambling stem.

Leaves 
The upper part of the plant is composed of carnivorous leaves while the lower part of the stem is covered with the dried remains of older leaves. The leaf arrangement on the stem is alternate. The petioles are 1.5–3 cm long and support 10–15 mm long and 7 mm wide obtuse to spatulate laminae. The root system is relatively undeveloped, serving mainly as an anchor and for water absorption, since nutrient uptake is achieved through carnivory.

Flowers and fruit 

The sepals are ovate and slightly pubescent. The seed capsules are dehiscent and bear numerous seeds up to 0.6 mm long.

Distribution 
Drosera madagascariensis is native to the tropical Africa (Guinea, Nigeria, Cameroon, Congo, Angola, Zambesi, Tanganyika) as far south as South Africa and east to the island of Madagascar. It is found in swamps and sphagnum bogs.

References 
 Ludwig Diels: Droseraceae. in Engler, A. (Hrsg.): Pflanzenr. 4, 112 : 109, 1906
 A.A. Obermeyer: The Flora of Southern Africa Vol. 13.

External links
 

madagascariensis
Carnivorous plants of Africa
Flora of West Tropical Africa
Flora of West-Central Tropical Africa
Flora of Northeast Tropical Africa
Flora of East Tropical Africa
Flora of South Tropical Africa
Flora of Southern Africa
Flora of Madagascar